Dream and Silence is a 2012 Spanish drama film directed by Jaime Rosales. The film was screened in the Directors' Fortnight section at the 2012 Cannes Film Festival.

Cast
 Yolanda Galocha as Yolanda
 Oriol Rosselló as Oriol

References

External links
 

2012 films
2012 drama films
Spanish drama films
2010s Spanish-language films
2010s Spanish films